Kaftareh (also Romanized as Kaftāreh; also known as Kaftārī) is a village in Arshaq Sharqi Rural District, in the Central District of Ardabil County, Ardabil Province, Iran. At the 2006 census, its population was 36, in 6 families.

References 

Towns and villages in Ardabil County